San Marcos Regional Airport  is a public use airport located in Caldwell County, Texas, United States. It is four nautical miles (7 km) east of the central business district of San Marcos, a city that is mostly in Hays County. The airport is owned by the City of San Marcos and operated by Texas Aviation Partners. It is located east of the border of Caldwell County and Hays County. Before it was operated as a civilian airport it was known as Gary Air Force Base.

Although most U.S. airports use the same three-letter location identifier for the FAA and IATA, this airport is assigned HYI by the FAA but has no designation from the IATA.

History

Military

It was the site of the Gary Army Airfield

Civilian
Organized San Marcans fought to save the base, and on November 20, 1964, President Lyndon B. Johnson announced in a speech at his alma mater, Southwest Texas State College that the abandoned Camp Gary would be the site of a new federal vocational training facility called Job Corps. Today it's known as the Gary Job Corps Center, the largest in the nation.

In 2014, the airport was selected to be the location for the Aircraft Owners and Pilots Association's regional fly-in.

Facilities and aircraft 
It has three asphalt paved runways: 8/26 is 6,330 by 100 feet (1,929 x 30 m), 13/31 is 5,603 by 150 feet (1,708 x 46 m) and 17/35 is 5,213 by 100 feet (1,589 x 30 m).

For the 12-month period ending September 30, 2015, the airport had 46,422 aircraft operations, an average of 127 per day: 98% general aviation, 2% military and <1% air taxi. At that time there were 108 aircraft based at this airport: 76% single-engine, 20% multi-engine and 4% jet.

Accidents and incidents 
Two airplanes collided on September 24, 2020 while attempting to land at San Marcos Regional Airport. Two men in one of the planes were injured while the pilot and sole occupant of the second one was uninjured. One of the planes burned and the second one overturned after crashing.

See also 
 List of airports in Texas

Notes

References

External links
 

Airports in Texas
San Marcos, Texas
Buildings and structures in Caldwell County, Texas
Transportation in Caldwell County, Texas
Transportation in Hays County, Texas
Airports in Greater Austin